Euryptera unilineatocollis is a species of beetle in the family Cerambycidae. It was described by Ernst Fuchs in 1956.

References

Lepturinae
Beetles described in 1956